Carel Hendrik Fourie, generally known as Hendre Fourie (born 19 September 1979 in Burgersdorp, Eastern Cape), is a retired South African professional Rugby footballer who finished his career playing for Aviva Premiership side Sale Sharks after signing from Leeds Carnegie in the Summer of 2011. His preferred position was at Flanker. Although he was born in South Africa, he is qualified for England through residency laws. He made his debut for his adopted nation on Saturday 6 November 2010 as a late replacement in a defeat to New Zealand at Twickenham.

Known to his team mates as 'Shrek,' Fourie moved to England in 2005 when he signed for Rotherham Titans. He was a central figure as Rotherham beat Leeds twice in the 2006–07 season, and reluctantly elected to move to Headingley after they were narrowly promoted as champions of National One.

Fourie was a relatively late developer at an elite level, only realising his potential under the tutelage of his mentor Andre Bester at the Rotherham Titans. This development was characterised by two significant changes in this game, the spin in the tackle and being more selective in hitting rucks. These changes combined with his raw power and his rucking technique allowed him to make a significant impact when hitting the Premiership scene with Leeds Carnegie.

Fourie was forced to retire from professional rugby union on 3 January 2013 due to a persistent shoulder injury.

References

External links
Leeds Carnegie Profile

1979 births
England international rugby union players
Leeds Tykes players
Living people
Afrikaner people
South African expatriate sportspeople in England
People from Burgersdorp
Rotherham Titans players
Rugby union flankers
South African rugby union players
Rugby union players from the Eastern Cape